Football is the most popular sport in Spain. Spain has some of the most influential teams in Europe (Real Madrid, Barcelona, Atlético de Madrid, Seville, Valencia, and others). It also has a high number of players (most of them are unprofessional) and teams registered in all categories (a total of 1,063,090 players in a total of 21,148 clubs). Moreover, football is the sport that interests the majority of Spanish people (48%). A total of 67% of the population said they were fans of or had a liking for a particular club.

In a survey of the sports habits of the Spanish population made in 2010, football was ranked as the second most popular recreational sport practiced by the population (17.9%). A total of 75.9% of people said they had purchased tickets to attend a football match. In addition, a total of 67.3% of the people said that they saw all, almost all, many, or some of the football matches broadcast on television. In another survey undertaken in 2014, the practice of football decreased to 14% of the population, being overtaken by other sports such as running, cycling, and swimming for recreation. However, in this survey, football was still the sport that interests the majority of Spain's people (48%). A total of 67% of the population said they were fans of or had sympathy for a particular club. In addition, 74.9% said they watched, whenever possible, the matches broadcast on television regarding their favorite teams, and 42.4% had flags, badges, or objects of their favorite teams. Data from this survey confirmed the widespread impression that most of Spain's people are supporters of Real Madrid (32.4%) or FC Barcelona (24.7%), and the other teams have fewer supporters nationwide, such as Atlético de Madrid (16.1%), Valencia CF (3.5%), Athletic Bilbao (3.3%), or Sevilla FC (3.2%).

A relationship between football, politics, intercultural relations, identity, and attitudes toward regionalism in Spain has also been reported.

The Royal Spanish Football Federation (Spanish: Real Federación Española de Fútbol) – the country's national football governing body – organises two Cup competitions: the Copa del Rey, and the Supercopa de España. The Liga de Fútbol Profesional (LFP) (English: Professional Football League), integrated by a total of 42 football clubs, forms part of the Royal Spanish Football Federation (RFEF) but has autonomy in its organisation and functioning. It is responsible for the organisation of state football leagues, in coordination with RFEF.

The Spain national football team has won the FIFA World Cup once and has also been successful in the UEFA European Championship and the Olympic tournament. The biggest success achieved by the national team was the historic treble of winning tournaments in a row: the UEFA European Championship in 2008, the FIFA World Cup in 2010, and the UEFA European Championship in 2012. They also won the UEFA cup in 1964. In all categories, the men's national teams of Spain have won a total of 26 titles in FIFA, UEFA, and Olympic tournaments within the European continent and even beyond. In qualifying for the UEFA championships, the team ranked highest in the number of shots (227) and possession (70%), and completed with the highest pass percentage (91%) out of all qualifying teams. The team was also the first to retain the Henri Delaunay trophy.

The First Division of the Liga de Fútbol Profesional – commonly known in the English-speaking world as La Liga – is one of the strongest football leagues in both Europe and the world. At the club level, Spanish football clubs have won a total of 66 international tournaments.
 They are the most successful in different current European competitions, such as UEFA Champions League, UEFA Super Cup, and UEFA Europa League; and they also were the most successful in the extinct Inter-Cities Fairs Cup.

The characteristic football style of play developed by the Spain national football team (and at the club level, by FC Barcelona) during its most successful time was Tiki-taka. This football style is characterised by possessing the ball for large portions of the game and moving the ball quickly from one player to the next, with short and quick passes, keeping the ball away from your opponent, and then delivering an incisive pass to score a goal.

Professional football in Spain is a sociocultural event that makes a significant contribution to the Spanish economy in terms of both demand and supply. In economic terms, during 2013, professional football generated more than €7.6 billion, including direct, indirect, and induced effects, representing 0.75% of Spanish GDP. Moreover, due to the financial crisis in the last  few years, many Spanish football clubs in the top two divisions have been facing severe economic troubles due to paying bank debts. In addition, the European Union authorities have warned the Spanish authorities to halt public funding of debt-ridden clubs.

Spain national futsal team is one of the strongest teams in the world, being six times champion in the UEFA Futsal Championship and two times champion in the FIFA Futsal World Championship.

History

Early years
Modern football was introduced to Spain in the late 19th century by a combination of mostly British immigrant workers, visiting sailors and Spanish students coming from Britain. In the late 1870s, various English workers scattered throughout the peninsula began to establish informal groups that were dedicated to different recreational practices, especially cricket and football, particularly in Spanish ports, such as the ones in Vigo, Andalusia (Huelva and Seville) and Bilbao, who were the regions that most felt this movement.

The first kick to a football ball on Spanish soil occurred in 1873 in either Huelva or Vigo, with the investigations about which one was the dean of football in Spain remaining inconclusive and open to debate by historians. That year, in Huelva, British workers of the Rio Tinto Company Limited (RTCL) began to arrive at the Minas de Ríotinto after the company won a concession to exploit the copper mines of Rio Tinto. The Englishmen who worked in the mines did not have much to do in the small town, so they gathered to play their favorite sports, like cricket, rugby, and football. Meanwhile, in Vigo, another group of British workers arrived, these belonging to the Eastern Telegraph Company from Porthcurno, south of Cornwall, a small isolated town located in the far west of England, thus earning the nickname "Exiles". These two colonies gave birth to the first Spanish football teams: Exiles Foot-Ball Club (1876) and Río Tinto Foot-Ball Club (1878). These teams, however, were never officially established, so there is no legal record of their existence. The first legally established Spanish football club was the Cricket and Football Club of Madrid, founded in October 1879, under the protection of King Alfonso XII, who was named the Honorary President of this club, which together with Exiles FC and Rio Tinto FC, was one of the three proto-clubs that pioneered and expanded football in Spain. Even though the Madrid team disappeared a few years later, Exiles FC and Rio Tinto FC lasted decades and played a pivotal role in the amateur beginnings of football in Spain.

Rio Tinto FC was the catalyst for the creation of Sociedad de Juego de Pelota in 1884, which organized football games along with other typical British sports. These meetings were initially contested between the club's members and later against crews of English ships who docked in the port of Huelva, with the earliest known example of this dating back to March 1888 when they played football and cricket matches against the mariners of a merchant ship called Jane Cory. This society developed into the oldest football club in Spain, Recreativo de Huelva, founded in December 1889 by two Scottish doctors of the Rio Tinto Company, Alexander Mackay and Robert Russell Ross, Exiles FC, on the other hand, lasted until the early 1910s, ascribing a lasting impact in the development of football in Vigo, since they established good relations with the first football clubs to emerge in the city, and collaborated with them by providing knowledge, players, coaches, and even sharing its field, El Relleno.

After Recreativo de Huelva, Sevilla FC is the next oldest club in Spain, being founded on 25 January 1890 by Isaias White and Edward Farquharson Johnston, the then British vice-consul of Seville and who became the club's first president. Unlike Huelva, Sevilla FC was primarily and solely devoted to football practice, which makes it the first football club ever founded in Spain. Although Gimnàstic de Tarragona was established in 1886, the club did not form an actual football team until 1914. The first official football game played in Spain took place in Seville on 8 March 1890 at what is now an abandoned mine near Calle Sanz. Sevilla FC played against Recreativo de Huelva. With the exception of two Spanish players on the Huelva team and another two players on the Seville team, all the players on both sides were British, mostly Scottish. Sevilla FC won 2–0.

Football was introduced to Bilbao by two distinct groups, both with British connections: British steel and shipyard workers and Basque students returning from schools in Britain, and who on their return to Bilbao began to arrange games with the British workers, with an early example of this coming in the spring of 1894, when some Bilbaínos faced an eleven of English residents in Bilbao in the morning of 3 May, ending in a 6–0 win for the British. This new sport continued to take root in the city and soon gained followers among the young students of the famous Gymnasium Zamacois, and in 1898, seven students belonging to that gym founded the first Basque football club: Athletic Club. This early British influence was reflected in the use of English names such as Recreation Club, Athletic Club  and Football Club. Although Athletic was founded in 1898, the club was not officially established until the historic meeting held in Café García on 5 September 1901, where the first board of the club was elected.

In the late 19th century, Catalonia enjoyed the most developed industry in the country, mainly thanks to its cotton industry, and for this reason, Barcelona was the home to an important British colony. The first known football match in the city was held on the grounds near the Hippodrome of Can Tunis in late 1892. Very little is known about that meeting, only that it was the work of members of the Club Regatas de Barcelona (a club of rowing and sailing) and cricket players of the British Club de Barcelona located on Rambla dels Capuchins. It was James Reeves, the spokesman of the British members of Club Regatas, who convinced some members of these two entities to practice football, thus forming a society which become known as the Barcelona Football Club. This group of football pioneers in the city played several matches in the 1892-93 season, most of which being training matches between Blue and Red teams. The last game of the season on 12 March 1893 proved to be of highly historical significance, since this game was the subject of the first proper chronicle of the dispute of a football match in Spain, which appeared in La Dinastía written by Enrique Font Valencia; and the photograph of the two sides before the game is widely regarded as the oldest photograph of a football team in Spain. However, the first official and registered football club was Palamós FC (Costa Brava, North of Catalonia) in 1898. The Swiss Hans Gamper founded FC Barcelona on 29 November 1899. Other clubs were founded in 1900, such as Escocès FC (ex Sant Andreu), Hispania AC (ex Team Rojo), University SC, FC Internacional, Irish Football Club and others, made up the list of teams that competed for local hegemony in the first and archaic competitions that were held, such as the Copa Macaya, which was the first-ever tournament held in Spain.

In Madrid, the first games were promoted by Institución Libre de Enseñanza (ILE) (English: Free Educational Institution), an educational and cultural centre. The first official and registered football club in Madrid was Football Club Sky, founded in 1897, but a conflict between its members caused the club to split in two in 1900. Then, several clubs also emerged in Madrid, most notably Madrid Football Club, which was officially established in March 1902 by Catalan brothers Juan and Carlos Padrós.

There are several curious cases, like the foundation of Locomotoras Albacete Balompié, a steam locomotive manufacturing company in Albacete owned by Talgo and the Lancashire and Yorkshire Railway Company. The latter one's main engineer, John Hulse, took the initiative to properly implement the Sheffield Rules to La Mancha and organises the first match between the company's workers in December 1893.

The rapid growth of enthusiasts and entities led to the creation of the first football associations in charge of its regulation. The first football association founded in Spain was the Catalan Football Federation (Catalan: Federació Catalana de Futbol), established in Catalonia on 11 November 1900, as the Football Association of Catalonia (Catalan: Football Associació de Catalunya). With the first associations came also the first competitions and tournaments, such as the Copa Macaya on 6 January 1901, which was organized on the initiative of Alfonso Macaya: the then honorary president of Hispania AC, who went on to win the first edition of the competition, thus becoming the very first Spanish club to win an official title. Copa Macaya was the first tournament ever played in Spain and in all Iberian Peninsula, and was the predecessor of the Catalan football championship (Catalan: Campionat de Catalunya). The Copa Macaya is recognized as the first Catalan championship. The Catalan Championship emerged just a few days after the Campeonato de Madrid, whose first edition was won by Moderno FC.

The still poorly organized sport still found many detractors that hindered further expansion, because it was considered dangerous in its early years. In 1902 the first national championship disputed in Spain was organized, the Copa de la Coronación, by the recently established Madrid Football Federation, which was the catalyst for the current Copa del Rey due to its success.

20th century

The Copa del Rey (English: King's Cup) competition was founded in 1903, one year after a previous football tournament named Coronation Cup. It was Spain's national football Championship from 1903 until the establishment of the League Championship in 1928.
 
The Spanish Federation of Football Clubs was formed in 1909, but there were discrepancies between the member clubs years later, and some of the clubs formed other association called Royal Spanish Union of Clubs of Football. Finally, the two associations reached an agreement and the Royal Spanish Football Federation was founded in 1913, which allowed the Spanish football to enter in FIFA. In these years, Athletic was the most dominant club in the country, and the first idols in Spain began to appear, like Pichichi and Paulino Alcántara.

The Spain national team was created in 1920 on the occasion of the dispute of the Olympic Games in Antwerp. The importance of the success of the Spain national team in the Olympic Games, which won the silver medal, was huge in the development of football as mass social event in Spain. The interest on football grew, more people attended to the stadiums, more information about football appeared in the newspapers, and football was used as element of national prestige and political propaganda.

After the Olympic triumph, football experienced a popularity boost among Spanish fans, and as a result, stadium attendances increased and the pressure of professionalism grew. Spanish football eventually turned professional in 1925. An agreement between several clubs was made on 23 November 1928 which officially established Spain's national football division, and the birth of the Spanish League. The first league championship began in 1929.

The Spanish Civil War (1936–1939) brought disruption to the national competitions. Although the Spanish League was suspended, the Catalan and Valencian clubs continued contesting in the Mediterranean League in early 1937. Barcelona later toured Mexico and the United States, raising support for the Spanish Republic.

The Spanish League and the Cup were restored in the 1939–40 season after Civil War had ended. Francisco Franco's regime, a fascist political system, began to use football as a propaganda tool for the new regime. In 1941, as part of his policy of eradicating regional identities, the Franco regime banned the use of non-Castilian names. As a result, many clubs that had chosen English prefixes previously, such as Athletic or Football club, had to amend their initial names, for other Castilian (as Atlético, or Club de Fútbol). The Catalan Championship was banned and the Catalan shield taken from FC Barcelona's badge. Spanish football began to rebuild slowly after the War, but Spain's isolated international position meant they did not properly re-enter International football until 1950. Later, Franco's regime was able to use the football, based on the European triumphs of Real Madrid in the 1950s for political purposes. In this manner, Real Madrid was used as a Spanish brand of success to promote Spain's image abroad, as well as the pride of being Spanish in the country itself.

Spain was selected as the host of the 1982 FIFA World Cup, and the national team was eliminated in the second group stage.

Until the 1984–85 season, the Royal Spanish Football Federation (RFEF) was responsible for organising the league tournament. Since then, the competition was organised by the Liga de Fútbol Profesional (LFP)(English: Professional Football League), an independent body which was formed at the initiative of the clubs themselves after disagreements with the RFEF regarding the management professionalization and economic division of the League benefits.

Since the entry into force of Spanish Law 10/1990, almost all of the clubs competing professionally in Spain are actually companies under the legal status of sports companies, whose ownership is in the hands of its shareholders. Only three professional clubs (Athletic Club, Barcelona and Real Madrid) kept its original structure, such as sports clubs directly controlled by their members.

Recent years
After the appearance of private television in Spain, football clubs hugely increased its income thanks to the lucrative contracts signed to be able to broadcast matches on television. This allowed them to sign many of the best players in the world, but as a result most of the clubs also vastly increased their spending. In the last few years La Liga has been living in a big financial turmoil. Although the two big powerful clubs, Real Madrid and Barcelona, were at the top in Forbes football rich list of 2013, the remaining clubs are weighed down by a colossal debt around €4.1 billion. For this reason, most of the clubs had to cut their budgets drastically. In 2013, the third biggest club, Atlético Madrid, had a debt of around €180 million, and to relieve that the club had to sell their star player, Radamel Falcao, for €60 million. Television companies also began to lose subscribers; Digital+ said it had lost 15% of subscribers since 2012 and Mediapro lost 25% from 2011 to 2013, also having to shut down MARCA TV in the process.

Spain national football team (La Roja)

Within Spain, regional teams, most notably the Catalonia national football team, the Basque Country national football team, and even the Galicia national football team, began to compete against each other from 1915 onwards. Despite not being officially recognised by FIFA, these regional teams still occasionally play friendly games with some national team players playing for both teams. Some autonomous governments and social sectors in the historical communities (especially in Catalonia and Basque Country) prefer to call their regional teams as national team, while claiming to participate in international tournaments.

The Spain national team, commonly referred to as La selección (English: The selection) or La Roja (English: The Red one), made their international debut at the 1920 Olympic Games in Belgium and came away with the silver medal. Since then the Spain national team has participated in a total of fifteen out of twenty one FIFA World Cups and nine out fourteen UEFA European Championship. Historically, the Spain national team did not achieve important results, in terms of trophies or develop an attractive playing style. Surprisingly, this fact contrasted with the huge success obtained by the main Spanish football clubs at the European level. Nevertheless, the triumphs of the Spain national team in 2008 and 2012 European Championship, and in 2010 FIFA World Cup, with an attractive playing style, marked a turning point that divided the history of Spain national football team in two parts.

The Spain national football team has been the winner of FIFA Team of Year in 2008, 2009, 2010, 2011, 2012 and 2013, as well as the winner of Laureus World Sports Award for Team of the Year in 2011.

The Spain national football team have won four trophies in FIFA and UEFA tournaments: one FIFA World Cup in 2010, and three UEFA European Championship in 1964, 2008 and 2012. In addition, it was runner-up in the UEFA European Championship in 1984 and in the FIFA Confederations Cup in 2013.

The Spain national under-23 team won the gold medal in 1992 Olympic tournament and the silver medal in 2000.

The Spain national football team won the gold medal at the Mediterranean Games in 2005, 2007, and 2018, the silver medal in 1955, and the bronze medal in 1963 and 1967.

In addition, the honours list includes numerous titles at junior level teams:

UEFA European Under-21 Championship in 1986, 1998, 2011, 2013, and 2019.

FIFA U-20 World Cup in 1999.

UEFA European Under-19 Championship (formerly Under-18) in 1995, 2002, 2004, 2006, 2007, 2011 2012, 2015, and 2019.

UEFA European Under-17 Championship (formerly Under-16) in 1986, 1988, 1991, 1997, 1999, 2001, 2007, 2008, and 2017.

1999 Meridian Cup.

Spain have won the Maurice Burlaz Trophy, the prize awarded to the national association that has achieved the best results in UEFA's men's youth competitions (UEFA European Under-19 Championship and UEFA European Under-17 championship) over the previous two seasons, in 1994, 1996, 1998, 2002, 2004, 2006, 2007, and 2011.

Players

Goalkeepers 
Ricardo Zamora (1920s/1930s), Antoni Ramallets (1940s/1960s), José Ángel Iribar (1960s/1980s), Luis Arconada (1970s/1980s), Andoni Zubizarreta (1970s/1990s), Iker Casillas (1990s/2010s),  David de Gea (2010s)

Defenders 
Jacinto Quincoces (1920s/1930s), Joan Segarra (1950s/1960s), Jesús Garay (1950s/1960s), José Santamaría (1950s/1960s), Feliciano Rivilla (1960s), José Antonio Camacho (1970s/1980s), Antonio Maceda (1980s), Rafael Gordillo (1970s/1990s), Miguel Ángel Nadal (1990s/2000s), Fernando Hierro (1980s/2000s), Abelardo Fernández (1990s/2000s), Carles Puyol (1990s/2010s), Sergio Ramos (2000s/2010s), Gerard Piqué (2000s/2010s), Jordi Alba (2010s)

Midfielders 
Josep Samitier (1920s/1930s), Martín Marculeta (1920s/1930s), Leonardo Cilaurren (1920s/1930s), José Luis Panizo (1940s/1950s), Antonio Puchades (1940s/1950s), Alfredo Di Stéfano (1950s/1960s), Luis del Sol (1960s/1970s), Luis Suárez (1960s/1970s), Luis Aragonés (1960s/1970s), Chus Pereda (1960s), Pirri (1960s/1970s), Jesús María Zamora (1970s/1980s), Míchel (1980s/1990s), José Luis Pérez Caminero (1990s), Luis Enrique (1990s/2000s), Pep Guardiola (1990s/2000s), Julen Guerrero (1990s), Gaizka Mendieta (1990s/2000s), Xavi (1990s/2010s), Xabi Alonso (2000s/2010s), Andrés Iniesta (2000s/2010s), Santi Cazorla (2000s/2010s), David Silva (2000s/2010s), Cesc Fàbregas (2000s/2010s), Juan Mata (2000s/2010s), Sergio Busquets (2000s/2010s)

Forwards 
Pichichi (1910s/20s) Paulino Alcántara (1910s/1920s), Luis Regueiro (1920s/1930s), Isidro Lángara (1930s), César (1940s/1950s), Telmo Zarra (1940s/1950s), Agustín Gaínza (1940s/1950s), Estanislau Basora (1940s/1950s), László Kubala (1950s/1960s), Ferenc Puskás (1960s), Francisco Gento (1950s/1960s), Amancio Amaro (1960s/1970s), Santillana (1970s/1980s), Juanito (1970s/1980s), Quini (1970s/1980s), Roberto López Ufarte (1970s/1980s), Emilio Butragueño (1980s/1990s), Julio Salinas (1980s/1990s), Raúl (1990s/2000s), Fernando Morientes (1990s/2000s), David Villa (2000s/2010s), Fernando Torres (2000s/2010s)

Football club competitions

Currently, the three most important competitions between clubs in Spain are La Liga (English: League), the Copa del Rey (English: King's Cup) and the Supercopa de España (English: Spanish Supercup). Other extinct competitions were the League Cup, the Eva Duarte Cup and the President's Cup of the Spanish Football Federation. Up to a total of sixteen clubs have been winners of some of the official competitions in Spain at the highest level, and FC Barcelona is the most awarded club with seventy-five national titles,

The Spanish football league system consists of several leagues bound together hierarchically by promotion and relegation. In addition, Spanish Royal Federation Cup is a football competition for teams from the Segunda División B, the Tercera División and sometimes from the Preferente Regional who have failed to qualify or have been eliminated in the first round of the Copa del Rey.

The League (La Liga) 

In April 1927, Álvaro Trejo, a director at Arenas Club de Getxo, first proposed the idea of a national league in Spain. After much debate about the size of the league and who would take part, the RFEF eventually agreed on the ten teams who would form the first Primera División in 1928. FC Barcelona, Real Madrid, Athletic Bilbao, Real Sociedad, Arenas Club de Getxo and Real Unión were all selected as previous winners of the Copa del Rey. Athletic Madrid, RCD Español and CE Europa qualified as Copa del Rey runners-up and Racing de Santander qualified through a knock-out competition against Sevilla FC. Barcelona was the first winner of the competition. Only three of the founding clubs, Real Madrid, Barcelona and Athletic Bilbao, have never been relegated from the Primera División; six other clubs have never been below the top two tiers: Sevilla, Real Sociedad, Sporting de Gijón, Valencia, Espanyol and Atlético Madrid.'Historically, some of the best football players in the world have played in the Spanish football league, including Ricardo Zamora, Josep Samitier, Alfredo Di Stéfano, Ladislav Kubala, Ferenc Puskás, Raymond Kopa, Héctor Rial, Telmo Zarra, Francisco Gento, Luis Suárez, Johan Cruyff, Diego Maradona, Bernd Schuster, Andoni Zubizarreta, Michael Laudrup, Hristo Stoichkov, Romário, Zinedine Zidane, Rivaldo, Ronaldo, Raúl, Ronaldinho, Carles Puyol, Xavi, Andrés Iniesta, Iker Casillas, Cristiano Ronaldo, and Lionel Messi, among others.

La Liga de Fútbol Profesional (LFP) is the association responsible for administering the two professional football leagues in Spain. Professional Spanish football is divided into the Primera División (First Division) and Segunda División (Second Division). The First Division is also known as Liga Santander, for sponsorship reasons, while the Second Division is known as La Liga SmartBank. The First Division consists of 20 professional teams and the Second Division has 22. There are also lower Spain national football divisions. Every year, the three lowest ranked teams in the First Division pass to the Second Division and the top three ranked teams in the Second Division pass to the First Division.

La Liga is one of the most popular professional sports leagues in the world. The average stadium attendance was 21,000 in the 2014–15 season, with a range of average attendance from 4,780 people in the stadium with the lowest average attendance to 77,632 people in the stadium with highest average attendance. In addition, La Liga is one of the wealthiest professional sports leagues in the world by revenue ($2.2 billion in 2016).

In La Liga's 90-year history (with the exception of the three seasons that the league was suspended due to the civil war), Barcelona and Real Madrid have won 60 titles between them. Barcelona and Real Madrid are two fierce rivals clubs, and the matches between both two clubs are named as El Clásico. Those football matches are one of the most viewed sports events in the world.

Although a total of 62 teams have competed in La Liga since its inception, only nine clubs have won the title: Real Madrid (35), Barcelona (26), Atlético Madrid (10), Athletic Bilbao (8), Valencia (6), Real Sociedad (2), Sevilla (1), Deportivo La Coruña (1), and Real Betis (1).

 King's Cup (Copa del Rey) 

The King's Cup is the oldest Spanish football competition organised by the Royal Spanish Football Federation. In 1902, Carlos Padrós, later president of Madrid FC (later to be Real Madrid), suggested a football competition to celebrate the coronation of Alfonso XIII. Four other teams entered the Copa del Ayuntamiento de Madrid, which would later develop into the Copa del Rey (English: "King's Cup"). These included Barcelona, Club Español de Fútbol, Club Bizcaya and New Foot-Ball de Madrid. The competition featured the first recorded game between Barcelona and Madrid FC, with the former emerging 3–1 winners. Club Bizcaya, which consisted of players from both Basque teams, eventually beat Barcelona in the final. Alfonso XIII subsequently became the patron of many Spanish football clubs, granting them permission to use "Real" (Spanish for "royal") in their names. Among the many clubs to add the prefix to their name was Madrid FC, which subsequently became Real Madrid.

The Copa del Rey was Spain's football national championship from 1903 (the first edition won by Athletic Bilbao with Juan de Astorquia as captain and president) until the foundation of the Campeonato de Liga—League Championship—in 1928. It was initially known as the Copa del Ayuntamiento de Madrid (Madrid City Council's Cup). Between 1905 and 1932, it was known as the Copa de Su Majestad El Rey Alfonso XIII (His Majesty King Alfonso XIII's Cup). During the Second Spanish Republic, it was known as the Copa del Presidente de la República (President of the Republic Cup) or Copa de España (Spanish Cup) and during the years of Francisco Franco's Spanish State, it was known as the Copa de Su Excelencia El Generalísimo or Copa del Generalísimo (His Excellency, The Supreme General's Cup).

Fourteen clubs have won the title: Barcelona (31), Athletic Bilbao (23), Real Madrid (19), Atlético Madrid (10), Valencia (8), Real Zaragoza (6), Sevilla (5), Espanyol (4), Real Unión (4), Real Betis (2), Deportivo de La Coruña (2), Real Sociedad (2), Arenas Club de Getxo (1) and Mallorca (1).

 Spanish Supercup (Supercopa de España) 

The Spanish Super Cup (Spanish: Supercopa de España) is a championship organised by Royal Spanish Football Federation and contested by the winners and runners-up of La Liga and the winners and runners-up of the Copa del Rey. The competition was founded in 1982.

Ten clubs have won the title: Barcelona (13), Real Madrid (12), Athletic Bilbao (3), Deportivo La Coruña (3), Atlético Madrid (2), Valencia (1), Zaragoza (1), Mallorca (1), Sevilla (1) and Real Sociedad (1).

Spanish clubs in international competitions

The Spanish football clubs are very successful in international competitions. They are the most successful in different current European competitions, such as UEFA Champions League, UEFA Super Cup, and UEFA Europa League ; and they also were the most successful in the extinct Inter-Cities Fairs Cup.

They benefit a lot from their political and historical success as a colonial power. After the Big War (a.a. WW II), Spanish Football Clubs had their most prolific period of the century. Because their political and economical positioning during Civil War and Cold War they were able to win several UEFA Champions Leagues in a row. Real Madrid CF was the only club that managed to win the competition between 1956 and 1960. They were in a great position due to economical advantage and lack of competition. Most of the countries were still recovering from a long and devastating World War II and they were unable to participate in the competition due to financial or political reasons. France, Germany, England, Yugoslavia and Russia are only a part of the important countries that were unable to compete in the European Competitions for at least a decade. Real Madrid was the one who benefited and won the title 5 years in a row.
Therefore, the most successful club in international competitions is Real Madrid, followed by Barcelona in recent years. In addition, other Spanish clubs have also won titles in international tournaments, such as Valencia, Atlético Madrid, Sevilla, Zaragoza, Villarreal, Deportivo de La Coruña, Celta Vigo and Málaga.

Spanish football clubs hold different records in international competitions.

Real Madrid is the most successful club in the European Cup/UEFA Champions League. They have won 14 titles and were runners-up three times. Real Madrid is also the most successful club in the Intercontinental Cup (three titles, shared record with Milan, Peñarol, Boca Juniors and Nacional) and FIFA Club World Cup, with four titles.

Barcelona is the second most successful club in the FIFA Club World Cup, with three titles, and it is also the most successful club in the UEFA Super Cup (five titles, shared record with Milan). In addition, Barcelona became the first football club to win six out of six competitions in a single year (2009) completing the sextuple, and the first European club in history to achieve the continental treble twice (2009 and 2015).

Sevilla is the most successful club in the UEFA Cup/UEFA Europa League, with six titles.

In total, the Spanish football clubs have won 78 international titles. Over the years, Spanish clubs have won the European Cups/Champions League eighteen  times, the UEFA Super Cup fourteen times, the UEFA Cup Winners' Cup seven times, the UEFA Cup/Europa League thirteen times, the UEFA Intertoto Cup seven times and the Inter-Cities Fairs Cup six times. In addition, Spanish clubs have also won the Intercontinental Cup four times, and the FIFA Club World Cup seven times.

Women's football

Women's football is a minor sport in Spain. Unlike the men's football, women's football is an amateur sport in Spain. 
However, in the recent years there is a growing social interest in women's football, which has led to an increase in economic investment. A record crowd for a European women's club football match was recorded at the Wanda Metropolitano stadium in Madrid on March 17, 2019, when 60,739 fans turned out to watch a game between Atlético Madrid and FC Barcelona; those attendance exceeded the previous record of 48,121 – also set in Spain earlier this year when Athletic Bilbao played Atlético Madrid at the San Mames stadium. Currently there are two national competitions, the League and the Copa de la Reina (English: Queen's Cup), in the semi-professional clubs involved structure.

The first teams and the first informal women's football competitions in Spain emerged in the 1970s, although they were not officially recognised by the Royal Spanish Football Federation until 1980, with the founding of the National Women's Football Committee. The first official national competition was the Championships of Spain (Copa de la Reina), established in 1983. The women's national league began to dispute the 1988–89 season.

The Spain women's national football team has been qualified twice in the FIFA Women's World Cup, and twice in the UEFA Women's Championship. Its youth division have had success in recent times. The Spain women's national under-19 football team won the UEFA Women's Under-19 Championship in 2004, 2017, and 2018 (runners-up in 2012, 2014, 2015, and 2016). The Spain women's national under-17 football team won the UEFA Women's Under-17 Championship in 2010, 2011, 2015, and 2018 (runners-up in 2009, 2014, 2016, and 2017), as well as the FIFA U-17 Women's World Cup in 2018 (runners-up in 2014, and third-place in 2010 and 2016).

Ethnic issues in Spanish football
While relatively calm today, the ethnic issues in Spain have long been a problem in the country. As for the legacy's result from the totalitarian and repressive Francisco Franco's regime, there has been a strong sense of racial segregation in Spanish football, whereas racism and previous tensions are frequently used to exploit as a sign of defiance, which has contributed to the lack of national success of Spain in international football despite its enormous talents and club powers; it is strongly reflected in Basque Country and Catalunya.

The famed El Clásico in Spain between Real Madrid and Barcelona have been marred with a number of issue in relationship between ethnic Catalans, majority supported Catalan independence and Barcelona, and the Spanish-based Real Madrid which sought to preserve Spain as an entity. The issue has been traced from the Francoist Spain, when Barcelona and Catalan identity was strongly suppressed, and the Madrid clubs (Real and Atlético Madrid) had been usually favored by Francoist regime. Following Franco's death, decades of political healing helped solving the country's dark past, however hostility between Catalan and Castillan population remains persisted and often contributes to significant football hostility in regard to Catalan identity and perceived suppression of Catalan language. Catalan-born players and coaches like Xavi, Carles Puyol and Pep Guardiola have strongly demonstrated the idea of an independent Catalunya, which often creates chaos several times.

Alongside the tensions between Catalans and Castilians, the tensions are also witnessed between Basques to the central Spanish government, which also extended to football, where Basques sought to preserve its identity and in several cases, clash against the Spanish officials and other pro-government clubs.https://www.iris-france.org/wp-content/uploads/2020/05/Obs-sport-Spain-Brun-mai-2020.pdf   Basque football officials have several times tried to gain, unsuccessfully, for recognition from the UEFA and FIFA as a separate team from Spain. Nationalist issue is also influenced in Basque football's relations with Spanish football.

There are also tensions between various ethnic regions in Spanish football, such as Andalusia, Asturias and Galicia between either themselves or to central government, though it has never extended to the level of tensions Catalans and Basques have.https://sserr.ro/wp-content/uploads/2014/12/1-36-43.pdf  

 +50,000-capacity Spanish football stadiums 

See also
 Football records and statistics in Spain
 List of association football competitions
 List of football clubs in Spain

References

Further reading

Ball, Phil. Morbo. The story of the Spanish football. WSC Books Ltd, 2011. 
Burns, Jimmy. La Roja: A journey through Spanish football. Simon & Schuster Ltd, 2012.  (Hardback)  (Trade paperback) 
Burns, Jimmy. La Roja: How soccer conquered Spain and how Spanish soccer conquered the world. Nations books, 2012.  (pbk.)  (e-book)
Lowe, Sid. Fear and Loathing in la Liga. Barcelona vs Madrid. Yellow Jersey Press, 2013.  (Hardback)  (Trade paperback)
Hunter, Graham. Spain: The inside history of la Roja's historic treble. BackPage Press, 2013. .
Quiroga, Alejandro. Football and national identities in Spain: the strange death of Don Quixote. Palgrave Macmillan, 2013.  
Vaczi, Mariann. Soccer, culture and society in Spain. An ethnography of Basque fandom. Routledge Taylor & Francis Group, 2015.  (hbk)  (ebk)
Llopis-Goig, Ramón. Spanish football and social change. Sociological investigations.'' Palgrave Macmillan, 2015.

External links
 Official RFEF Site
 Official LFP Site
 BDFutbol
  La Liga and Spanish Football in English